Osburg  is a municipality in the Trier-Saarburg district, in Rhineland-Palatinate, Germany, near Trier. The elevation of the built up area lies between 437 and 500 m, and the lowest and highest points of the municipality are 239 and 708 m.

External links
 Homepage
 Websites in Osburg

References

Municipalities in Rhineland-Palatinate
Trier-Saarburg